Ndah is an African surname. Notable people with the surname include:

 George Ndah (born 1974), Nigerian football player
 Olisa Ndah (born 1998), Nigerian football player
 Tempa Ndah (born 1973), Beninese football referee

Surnames of African origin